Pennsylvania's fifth congressional district encompasses all of Delaware County, an exclave of Chester County, a small portion of southern Montgomery County and a section of southern Philadelphia. Democrat Mary Gay Scanlon represents the district.

Prior to 2018, the fifth district was located in north-central Pennsylvania and was the largest in area, and therefore least densely populated, of all of Pennsylvania's congressional districts. It was Republican-leaning and represented by Glenn Thompson (R). However, in February 2018, the Supreme Court of Pennsylvania redrew this district after ruling the previous congressional district map unconstitutional due to partisan gerrymandering, assigning its number to a more left-leaning district in southeastern Pennsylvania for the 2018 elections and representation thereafter–essentially, a successor to the old seventh district. Most of Thompson's territory became a new, heavily Republican 15th district. He was re-elected there.

Geography

Pennsylvania's 5th congressional district is located in the southeastern corner of Pennsylvania and includes all or part of the following four counties:
Chester
Delaware
Montgomery
Philadelphia

Cities in this district include:
Philadelphia
Chester

The entirety of Delaware County and the majority of both the Main Line Suburbs and South Philadelphia are part of this district.

Characteristics
The 5th district is mostly suburban, but contains some urban and rural areas as well. The Chester County exclave is rural. The entirety of Delaware County is within the district and is a suburban area. The surrounding northern Montgomery district is also mostly suburban, while the South Philadelphia area in the district is mostly urban. The district is fairly diverse compared to others in Pennsylvania, and is roughly 25% African American.

Economy
The 5th district is largely reliant on industries in finance, education, public works, and private sector jobs.

List of members representing the district 

1791–1793: One seat

1795–1813: One seat
District restored in 1795.

1813–1823: Two seats

1823–Present: One seat

Recent election results

Historical district boundaries

See also
List of United States congressional districts
Pennsylvania's congressional districts

References

 Congressional Biographical Directory of the United States 1774–present

External links
District map
Congressional redistricting in Pennsylvania

05
Constituencies established in 1791
1791 establishments in Pennsylvania
Constituencies disestablished in 1793
1793 disestablishments in Pennsylvania
Constituencies established in 1795
1795 establishments in Pennsylvania